In anabelian geometry, a branch of algebraic geometry, the section conjecture gives a conjectural description of the splittings of the group homomorphism , where  is a complete smooth curve of genus at least 2 over a field  that is finitely generated over , in terms of decomposition groups of rational points of .

References

External links 

Algebraic geometry
Unsolved problems in geometry

Arithmetic geometry